Ubisoft Toronto Inc. is a Canadian video game developer and a studio of Ubisoft based in Toronto. The studio was established under Jade Raymond in September 2010. Games developed by Ubisoft Toronto include Tom Clancy's Splinter Cell: Blacklist, Far Cry 5, Starlink: Battle for Atlas, Far Cry 6, and Watch Dogs Legion.

History 
Ubisoft announced in July 2009 that it was establishing a Toronto-based development studio. Yannis Mallat, the chief executive officer (CEO) of Ubisoft Montreal, was to become Ubisoft Toronto's CEO, while the government of Ontario was to invest  over a course of 10 years to create up to 800 jobs. Unlike other Ubisoft studios, Ubisoft Toronto was immediately allowed to lead development of its games, whereas others start by only supporting larger studios like Ubisoft Montreal, though Ubisoft Toronto also served to support Montreal as part of its initial role as a sister studio.

By September 2009, Jade Raymond was put in charge of establishing the studio. Most of the studio's staff in its development phase, including Raymond, transferred to the new location from Ubisoft Montreal. Key hires included producer Alexandre Parizeau and creative director Maxime Béland, who were brought on for the production of a new game in the Tom Clancy's Splinter Cell series, and were considered co-founders of the studio alongside Raymond. A second, smaller development team for an undisclosed project was headed up by Lesley Phord-Toy, and Rima Brek was put in charge of the studio's internal Technology Group. By May 2010, Ubisoft Toronto had received more than 2,000 job applications.

Ubisoft Toronto's offices were established from a former General Electric building in the Junction Triangle neighborhood of Toronto. Ubisoft Toronto began operating in late 2009 and formally opened in September 2010.

By March 2012, Ubisoft Toronto had grown to 200 people, and to 300 by September 2013. By the latter, the studio had received 30,000 applications and given 1,800 job interviews. In September 2012, Ubisoft Toronto received an internal performance capture studio. The studio's debut project, Tom Clancy's Splinter Cell: Blacklist, was released in August 2013 to critical success. Raymond left the studio and was succeeded as general manager by Parizeau. By July 2015, Ubisoft Toronto was developing an original intellectual property (IP). This game was later revealed to be Starlink: Battle for Atlas, an action-adventure game with optional toys-to-life integration. The game was released in 2018 as the studio's first own IP. As of July 2017, Ubisoft Toronto has 600 staff members.

Near the end of June 2020 and into July 2020, a wave of accusations related to the MeToo movement swept through the video game industry, including several directed at some Ubisoft employees. Over one hundred employees of Ubisoft Toronto wrote to Parizeau in late June to report concerns related to sexual misconduct and the lack of action taken by management and human resources in response to their prior reports. Ubisoft announced it had investigated these reports, and in the case of Ubisoft Toronto, had requested studio co-founder Maxime Béland resign from the company. Speaking to Kotaku, some of these employees stated that there were still additional problems at the studio that went beyond Béland and they were still seeking signs of larger change from the studio and Ubisoft as a whole. Parizeau left the company in February 2021 and was replaced by Istvan Tajnay, who had previously been the managing director for Ubisoft Berlin. In December 2021, it was announced that the studio was developing a remake of Tom Clancy's Splinter Cell (2002); reports on the project appeared earlier in October.

Games developed

Notes

References

External links 
 

Canadian companies established in 2010
2010 establishments in Ontario
Canadian subsidiaries of foreign companies
Companies based in Toronto
Ubisoft divisions and subsidiaries
Video game companies established in 2010
Video game companies of Canada
Video game development companies